Quality Street Music 2 is the fifth studio album by American hip hop disc jockey DJ Drama. It was released on July 22, 2016, by Entertainment One Music, Embassy Entertainment, Aphilliates Music Group and Generation Now. The album serves as a sequel to Quality Street Music (2012). The album features guest appearances from T.I., Lil Uzi Vert, Lil Wayne, Chris Brown, Mac Miller, Post Malone, Skeme and Ty Dolla Sign, among others.

Singles
The album lead single, called "Right Back" was released on September 29, 2014. The track features guest verses from southern hip hop recording artists Jeezy, Young Thug and Rich Homie Quan, while the production was handled by The Mekanics and Syk Sense.

The album's second single, called "Wishing" was released on May 2, 2016. The track features guest vocals from American R&B recording artists Chris Brown and LyQuin, alongside a rapper Skeme, while the production was handled by J Nat Beats.

Track listing

Charts

References

2016 albums
DJ Drama albums
Albums produced by Don Cannon
Albums produced by Honorable C.N.O.T.E.
Albums produced by FKi (production team)
Albums produced by Lil' C (record producer)
Sequel albums